Rebecca Heyliger (born 24 November 1992) is a Bermudian swimmer. She competed in the women's 50 metre freestyle event at the 2016 Summer Olympics where she ranked 52nd with a time of 26.54 seconds. She did not advance to the semifinals.

References

External links
 

1992 births
Living people
Bermudian female swimmers
Olympic swimmers of Bermuda
Swimmers at the 2016 Summer Olympics
Place of birth missing (living people)
Bermudian female freestyle swimmers